The Emanuel Kahn House, at 678 E. South Temple St. in Salt Lake City, Utah, is a Queen Anne house that was built in 1889.  It was listed on the National Register of Historic Places in 1977.

It is significant for its association with Emanuel Kahn, an immigrant from Germany, who was one of the first Jewish merchants in Utah.  And it is significant as an outstanding Queen Anne style house.

Its architect, Henry Monheim, was one of the first "Gentile" (non-Mormon) architects in Utah.

A contributing building in the South Temple Historic District, it now houses a bed and breakfast called The Anniversary Inn.

References

Queen Anne architecture in Utah
Houses completed in 1889
Houses in Salt Lake City
National Register of Historic Places in Salt Lake City